Pedro Manrique de Lara, O.S.A. (1553–1615) was a Roman Catholic prelate who served as Archbishop of Zaragoza (1611–1615) and Bishop of Tortosa (1601–1611).

Biography
Pedro Manrique de Lara was born in Crotone, Italy in 1553 and ordained a priest in the Order of Saint Augustine.
On 12 February 1601, he was appointed during the papacy of Pope Clement VIII as Bishop of Tortosa.
On 8 April 1611, he was appointed during the papacy of Pope Paul V as Archbishop of Zaragoza.
He served as Archbishop of Zaragoza until his death on 7 June 1615.

References

External links and additional sources
 (for Chronology of Bishops) 
 (for Chronology of Bishops) 

17th-century Roman Catholic bishops in Spain
Bishops appointed by Pope Clement VIII
Bishops appointed by Pope Paul V
1553 births
1615 deaths